Diomedes Maturan (August 16, 1940 – April 7, 2002) (tagged the "Perry Como of the Philippines" and "The Golden Voice") was an actor who played in Botika sa Baryo (1960) and a grand champion in Tawag ng Tanghalan.

Early life
Diomedes was born in Bacolod City, Negros Occidental Province.

Career
He rose to fame by winning the popular singing competition "Tawag ng Tanghalan" for his song "Rose Tattoo" in 1955.

Death
Maturan died on April 7, 2002 of heart attack at age 61 in the City of Manila.

Discography
Ako'y Nakikiusap
Alam Mo Ba Mahal Kita?
Bakit
Buhat
Dahil Sa Iyo
Di Maipagtapat
Di Mo Man Lang Pinansin
Dinggin
Don't Play With Fire
Gabi at Araw
In Despair
In This Corner
Kailan Man Hanggang Wakas
Kay Hirap Pala Ng Iwanan
Lahat Ng Araw
Magmula Ngayon
Nasaan Ka
Rose Tattoo
Sana'y Maniwala
Thru Eternity

References

External links

Artist Section for Diomedes Maturan

1940 births
2002 deaths
Filipino male film actors
20th-century Filipino male singers 
Burials at the Manila Memorial Park – Sucat
Actors from Negros Occidental
People from Bacolod